A smoke ring is a visible vortex ring formed by smoke in a clear atmosphere.

Smokers may blow smoke rings from the mouth, intentionally or accidentally. Smoke rings may also be formed by sudden bursts of fire (such as lighting and immediately putting out a cigarette lighter), by shaking a smoke source (such as an incense stick) up and down, by firing certain types of artillery, or by the use of special devices, such as vortex ring guns and vortex ring toys.  The head of a mushroom cloud is a large smoke ring.

A smoke ring is commonly formed when a puff of smoke is suddenly injected into clear air, especially through a narrow opening.  The outer parts of the puff are slowed by the still air (or by edges of the opening) relative to the central part, imparting it the characteristic poloidal flow pattern.

The smoke makes the ring visible, but does not significantly affect the flow.  The same phenomenon occurs with any fluid, producing vortex rings which are invisible but otherwise entirely similar to smoke rings.

Smoking and breathing

A smoker may produce rings by taking smoke into their mouth and expelling it with a tongue flick, by closing the jaw, tapping the cheek, or producing a sudden burst of air with the lungs and throat.  The smoker may also use any of those methods to blow into a cloud of smoke outside their mouth.

A trick often performed in conjunction with mouth-blown smoke rings is the French inhale.

It is also possible to produce a vapour ring by using the same techniques on a cold day by exhaling.

The most famous such steam rings were those produced during the mid-20th century by Douglas Leigh's billboard on the Hotel Claridge in New York City's Times Square, advertising Camel cigarettes. An automated steam chamber behind the billboard produced puffs of steam every four seconds, giving the appearance of smoke rings leaving the smoker's open mouth and drifting away.  Inspired by a World War II-era prohibition on lighted advertising, the Camel smoker remained a Times Square landmark long afterward.

Some users of electronic cigarettes modify their devices to inhale large amounts of vapour at once, to exhale "clouds" in patterns like smoke rings.

Volcanoes

Under particular conditions, some volcanic vents can produce large visible smoke rings. Though a rare phenomenon, several volcanoes have been observed emitting massive vortex rings of steam and gas:
Mount Etna, Italy (Sicily)
Stromboli, Italy (Aeolian Islands)
Eyjafjallajökull, Iceland
Hekla, Iceland
Tungurahua, Ecuador
Pacaya, Guatemala
Mount Redoubt, United States (Alaska)
Mount Aso, Japan (Kyushu)
Whakaari (White Island), New Zealand
Gunung Slamet, Indonesia (Central Java)
Momotombo, Nicaragua (León)

See also
 Bubble ring
 Vortex ring toy

References

External links

 
 How to puff a smoke ring?
 Blowing a smoke ring (wikiHow)
 Smoke rings generated by eruptions of Etna volcano
 Smoke rings from Stromboli volcano
 Instructions on building a smoke ring cannon
 Smoke rings at US Army disposals in Iraq  (see images on bottom)
 Thomson, Sir William (Lord Kelvin), On Vortex Atoms, Proceedings of the Royal Society of Edinburgh, Vol. VI, 1867, pp. 94–105.
 Silliman, Robert H., William Thomson: Smoke Rings and Nineteenth-Century Atomism, Isis, Vol. 54, No. 4. (Dec., 1963), pp. 461–474. JSTOR link
 Movie of a modern recreation of Tait's smoke ring experiment
 How to Blow Smoke Rings - Howiw
 How To Blow Smoke Rings

Vortices
Smoke
Smoking